Skikda is a province (wilaya) of Algeria, on its eastern Mediterranean coastline.

History
The province was created from Constantine (department) in 1974.

Administrative divisions
The province is divided into 13 districts (daïras), which are further divided into 38 communes or municipalities.

Districts

 Aïn Kechra
 Azzaba
 Ben Azzouz
 Collo
 El Hadaik
 El Harrouch
 Ouled Attia
 Oum Toub
 Ramdane Djamel
 Sidi Mezghiche
 Skikda
 Tamalous
 Zitouna

Communes

 Aïn Bouziane
 Aïn Charchar (Ain Cherchar)
 Aïn Kechra  
 Aïn Zouit
 Azzaba
 Bekkouche Lakhdar
 Benazouz (Ben Azzouz)
 Beni Bechir
 Beni Oulbane
 Beni Zid
 Bir El Ouiden
 Bouchtata
 Cheraia
 Collo
 Djendel Saadi Mohamed
 El Ghedir
 El Hadaik
 El Harrouch
 El Marsa
 Emdjez Edchich
 Essebt (Es Sebt)
 Filfla (Fil Fila)
 Hamadi Krouma
 Kanoua
 Kerkera
 Kheneg Mayoum
 Oued Z'hor
 Ouldja Boulballout (Ouldja Boulbalout)
 Ouled Attia
 Ouled Hbaba (Ouled Hebaba)
 Oum Toub
 Ramdane Djamel
 Salah Bouchaour
 Sidi Mezghiche
 Skikda
 Tamalous
 Zerdazas
 Zitouna

References

External links

 Official website

 
Provinces of Algeria
States and territories established in 1974